Blue Moon Blue is a 2006 album by Japanese musician and singer Yukihiro Takahashi.

Track listing
 "Something New" (4:51)
 "Blue Moon Blue" (4:47)
 "A Star Is Born" (4:45)
 "In Cold Queue" (4:48)
 "Lay My Love" (5:18)
 "I Like The Wright Brothers, But No Airplanes" (3:33)
 "Still Walking To The Beat" (4:58)
 "Exit To Reality" (3:29)
 "Slow Turning Of My Heart" (4:46)
 "Where Are You Heading To?" (4:11)
 "In This Life" (5:04)
 "Eternally" (4:25)

Personnel
Yukihiro Takahashi - lead Vocals, keyboards, drums
Haruomi Hosono - bass (track 2)
Hirofumi Tokutake - acoustic guitar (tracks 2, 12)
Marke Newton - artwork
Tomohiko Gondo - engineer (tracks 1, 2, 3, 5, 6, 10, 11, 12), Euphonium (tracks 5, 6, 12), Glockenspiel (tracks 1, 4, 5), melodica (tracks 2, 10), flugelhorn (track 1),  trombone (track 2), programmer
Yoshifumi Iio - engineer (tracks 7, 9)
Tom Coyne - mastering
Shunji Suzuki - acoustic guitar (track 6)
Chiho Shibaoka - voice [Swedish] - (tracks 1, 2, 9)
Albrecht Kunze - vocals (track 1)
Yusuke Hayashi (track 6)
Eriko Sekiya - voice (track 10)
Yasuo Kimoto - engineer (track 8)
Steve Jansen - producer (sound) (track 11)

2006 albums
Yukihiro Takahashi albums